Business Management Training College is a South African college established in 1973 in association with the Institute of Business Management. In the three decades that it has been in operation, the college has trained more than 100,000 students. Tuition is currently by distance education only. Although their tuition is currently distance learning, they also connect with lecturers and have participations.

The institution is committed to promoting the Human Resource (HR) industry in South Africa. It has been voted HR provider of the year for 6 consecutive years (2012-2018) by the South African Board for Peoples Practices (SABPP).

It has state-of-the-art Virtual Campus (VC) which allows students to experience the full campus in a virtual environment. This is so the students do not feel isolated. The Virtual Campus also includes an online library that is accessible 24/7.

Ranking

References

External links
Official Site

Distance education institutions based in South Africa
Educational institutions established in 1973
1973 establishments in South Africa